Forterra (formerly Cascade Land Conservancy), based in Seattle, Washington, US, is the state of Washington’s largest land conservation, stewardship and community building organization dedicated solely to the region.

Currently, Forterra operates in multiple counties. Principal offices are in Seattle, Roslyn, and Tacoma.

Accomplishments 
Forterra has conserved  of working farms, forestlands and natural areas to date. Some of the major conservation projects include  Saddle Swamp,  Maury Island Marine Park and  Snoqualmie Tree Farm.

In December 2016, Forterra acquired 376 acres of forest near the North and Middle Forks of the Snoqualmie River, jointly with Washington’s Department of Natural Resources.

Green Cities 
Forterra has official partnerships with the cities of Everett, Kent, Kirkland, Redmond, Seattle, and Tacoma in leading stewardship projects at city parks and urban forests. Public volunteers and volunteer Forest Stewards work with cities and Cascade Land Conservancy in implementing 20 year plans to protect urban forests from invasive plants.

On November 2, 2011, Cascade Land Conservancy officially changed the organization's name to 'Forterra' (meaning 'for the earth') in order to reflect the organization's changing goals. As Washington State's largest conservation and stewardship organization, the 'Cascade' in the name did not reflect the statewide work area. 'Land Conservancy' likewise no longer embodied the purpose of the organization.

Green Seattle Partnership 
The Green Seattle Partnership is a partnership between the City of Seattle and Forterra with the goal of combating invasive species and preserving parklands in Seattle, Washington.

External links

References 

Non-profit organizations based in Seattle